Carter is a family name, and also may be a given name. Carter is of Irish, Scottish and English origin and is an occupational name given to one who transports goods by cart or wagon ultimately of Celtic derivation. It may also appear as an English reduced form of the Irish and Scottish Gaelic derived McCarter or the Scottish-Gaelic Mac Artair with Mc meaning "son of." Its appearance and pronunciation as Carter may also be the Anglicized form of the Irish Mac Artúir, Cuirtéir, or Ó Cuirtéir. The name is related to the Gaelic word cairt meaning cart, and ultimately from the Latin carettarius. Additionally, in Gaelic, the word "cairtear", which means tourist or sojourner, is also related. Following the Norman invasion of Ireland in the 1100s Roman Catholic English derived Carter's also arrived in Ireland and settled into walled towns established by the Normans. These Anglo-Normans assimilated into Irish culture, adopting Irish Gaelic customs, language, and religion unlike later English and Scottish Protestant planter settlers in Ireland who arrived between the 1550s and 1700 and mainly settled in Ulster during the plantation of Ulster, establishing the Ulster Protestant community.

It is the 44th most common surname in the United States and 56th most common in England. In Ireland it is ranked between McGarry and Cannon where it is found with greatest frequency in County Laois as the 70th most common surname, and 274th in Scotland where it is found with greatest frequency in the Outer Hebrides as the 140th most common surname.

People of European heritage bearing this surname may trace their ancestors back to Ireland, England or Scotland. Within the past 150 years, the Carter surname has been adopted widely by African Americans as taken from slavemasters by former slaves upon the Emancipation and 13th Amendment, through mixing with those masters (who were typically of English or Scottish descent), or through the common mixing found between Irish immigrants and free African Americans in Northern cities and communities such as Five Points and Seneca Village in New York City and elsewhere in the United States. This name is common among African Americans capable of tracing their roots back to the southern United States or Caribbean from the early 20th century onward, with some 35% of name holders of Carter in the United States being of African-American descent and it being the 22nd most common surname for Black Americans.

People with the surname

A 
Aaron Carter (1987-2022), American musician
Ad Carter (1895–1957), American comic strip cartoonist
Adam Carter (footballer) (born 1994), Australian rules footballer from Western Australia
Adrian Carter (born 1959), British architect
Aimee Carter (born 1986), American writer
Al Carter, (born 1952), American journalist
Alan Carter (disambiguation), multiple people
Albert Carter (disambiguation), multiple people
Alex Carter (disambiguation), multiple people
Ali Carter (born 1979), English professional snooker player
Allen 'Big Al' Carter (1947–2008), American artist
Ally Carter (born 1974), American author
Amanda Carter (born 1964), Australian Paralympic basketball player
Amon G. Carter (1879–1955), publisher of the newspaper Fort Worth Star-Telegram
Amy Carter (born 1967), youngest child of former U.S. president Jimmy Carter and his wife, Rosalynn
Amy Carter (politician), American politician 
Andre Carter (born 1979), American football defensive end
Andrew Carter (disambiguation), multiple people
Angela Carter (1940–1992), English novelist and journalist
Anita Carter (1933–1999), American singer-songwriter
Ann Carter (1936–2014), American actress
Ann Carter (rioter) (died 1629), English activist
Anne Hill Carter Lee, (1773–1829), American, mother of Confederate General Robert E. Lee
Anson Carter (born 1974), Canadian professional ice hockey player
Anthony Carter (disambiguation), multiple people
A. P. Carter (1891–1960), American country music musician, founder of the Carter Family musical group
April Carter, British academic and political activist
Arnold Carter (1918–1989), American baseball player
Asa Earl Carter (1925–1979), American speechwriter; novelist under the pseudonym Forrest Carter
Ashley Carter (born 1995), English footballer
Ash Carter (1954–2022), American physicist, Harvard University professor, and US Secretary of Defense

B 
Barry White (born Barry Eugene Carter, 1944–2003), American soul and disco singer
Ben Carter (basketball) (born 1994), American-Israeli basketball player in the Israel Basketball Premier League
 Ben Carter (1939–2014), known as Ben Ammi Ben-Israel, American founder and spiritual leader of the African Hebrew Israelites of Jerusalem
 Ben Carter (born 1981), English drummer for Evile
Ben Carter (actor) (1910–1946), American actor and casting agent
Benny Carter (1907–2003), American jazz musician
Benny Carter (painter) (1943–2014), American folk artist
Bernard Carter (banker) (1893–1961), American soldier and banker
Betty Carter (1930–1998), American jazz singer
Bill Carter (born 1966), American writer and documentary director
Billy Carter (1937–1988), American younger brother of U.S. president Jimmy Carter
Billy Carter (ice hockey) (born 1937), Canadian ice hockey player 
Blue Ivy Carter (born 2012), American singer
Bo Carter (1893–1964), American blues musician
Bob Carter (musician) (1922–1993), American jazz bassist and arranger
Bob Carter (cricketer, born 1937), English cricketer for Worcestershire
Bobby Carter (1939–2015), American politician in Tennessee
Brandon Carter (born 1942), Australian theoretical physicist noted for work on the properties of black holes
Brandon Carter (American football) (born 1986), American footballer and wrestler known as TAC
Brett Carter (politician) (born 1972), American politician
Brett Carter (rugby league) (born 1989), British rugby league footballer
Bruce Carter (disambiguation), multiple people
Buddy Carter (born 1957), American Congressman from Georgia
Bunchy Carter (1942–1969), American activist in the Black Panther Party

C 
Carl Carter (born 1964), American footballer
Carlene Carter (born 1955), American country singer-songwriter
Carol Ann Carter, American artist
Cedric Carter, British clinical geneticist 
Cethan Carter (born 1995), American football player
Chance Carter (born 2001), Canadian soccer player
Charles Carter (disambiguation), multiple people
Chennedy Carter (born 1998), American basketball player
Chesley William Carter (1902–1994), Canadian Member of Parliament and senator
Chris Carter (disambiguation), multiple people
Clarence Holbrook Carter (1904–2000), American painter
Clarence Carter (born 1936), American singer and musician
Claude Carter (1881–1952), South African cricketer
Clifford Carter (born 1952), American keyboardist
Clive Carter, British actor and singer
Colin Carter, Canadian economist
Cris Carter (born 1965), American football wide receiver
Curtis L. Carter (born 19??), American? academic
Cynthia Carter (born 1959), British academic, writer and feminist

D 
Dale Carter (born 1969), American football cornerback
Dan Carter (born 1982), New Zealand rugby player
Daniel Carter (disambiguation), multiple people, several other people
Danielle Carter (actress), Australian actress
Danielle Carter (footballer) (born 1993), English footballer
Darrell Carter (born 1967), English cricketer
Darren Carter (rugby league) (born 1972), British rugby league footballer
Darren Carter (born 1983), English football player
Darren Carter (comedian), American actor and stand-up comedian
Daryl Carter (born 1975), American football linebacker
Dave Carter (1952–2002), American folk singer and songwriter
David Carter (disambiguation), multiple people
Davy Carter (born 1975), American politician in Arkansas
Dean Carter (born 1955), American convicted spree-killer
Deana Carter (born 1966), American singer-songwriter of country music
Derrick Carter (born 1969), American house producer and DJ
Derrick Carter (footballer) (born 1982), Guyanese international footballer
Desmond Carter (1895–1939), British lyricist
Desmond Keith Carter (1967–2002), American who was executed in North Carolina for a 1992 murder
Dennis Malone Carter (18??-1881), Irish born American artist who painted portraits and historical settings
Dexter Carter (born 1967), American football running back
Dick Carter (1916–1969), American baseball player and manager
Dixie Carter (1939–2010), American actress
Dixie Carter (wrestling) (born 1964), American wrestling promoter 
Dominic Carter, American news reporter and political commentator
Don Carter (disambiguation), multiple people
Donna Carter (c. 1944 – 2018), Trinidadian politician and diplomat
Doris Carter (1912–1999), Australian high jumper and discus thrower
Dorothy Carter (1935–2003), American musician
Douglas Carter (1908–1988), New Zealand politician
Douglas F. Carter, Canadian-born Californian politician
Duane Carter (1913–1993), American racecar driver in the Indianapolis 500
Dudley C. Carter (1891–1991), Canadian-American woodcarver
Duncan Carter-Campbell of Possil (1911–1990), Scottish Soldier
Dwayne Michael Carter Jr. (born 1982), rapper known as "Lil Wayne"

E 
Earl Carter (disambiguation), multiple people
Edith Carter (fl.1920s and 1930s), English actress and playwright
Edmund Carter (cricketer, born 1785) (1785–?), English cricketer
Edmund Carter (cricketer, born 1845) (1845–1923), English cricketer
Edward Carter (disambiguation), multiple people
Edwin Carter (c. 1830–1900), American naturalist
Edwin Carter (pseudonym) (1962–2006), pseudonym of British-Russian defector and former officer of the Russian FSB Alexander Litvinenko
E. Finley Carter, director/president of SRI International from 1956 to 1963
Elizabeth Carter (1717–1806), English poet, classicist, writer and translator
Ellen Carter (1762–1815), English artist and illustrator
Elliott Carter (1908–2012), American classical music composer
Elmer Carter (1911–2011), American baseball player
Eric Carter (BMX rider) (born 1970), American BMX racer
Eric Carter (Canadian football) (born 1969), American Canadian footballer
Ernest Trow Carter (1866–1953), American organist and composer
Ernest Carter (drummer) (born 19??), American drummer
Ethan Carter III (born 1983), ring name of American professional wrestler Michael Hutter

F 
Finn Carter (born 1960), American actress
 Forrest Carter, pseudonym of Asa Earl Carter
Frances Ann Tasker Carter (1738–1787), wife of Robert Carter, wealthy Virginia plantation owner
Francis Carter (priest) (1851–1935), British Anglican priest
Francis John Carter (1869–1949), New Zealand sawmiller
Frank Carter (disambiguation), multiple people
Fred Carter (disambiguation), multiple people
Freddy Carter (born 1993), English actor

G 
Gary Carter (1954–2012), American professional baseball player
Geoff Carter 1943–2018), English footballer
George Carter (disambiguation), multiple people
Gerald Emmett Carter (1912–2003), Cardinal Archbishop of Toronto
Gerald Carter (born 1957), American football wide receiver
Glenn Carter (born 1964), English stage actor and singer–songwriter
Gloria Carter Spann (1926–1990), motorcyclist and sister of Jimmy Carter
G. R. Carter (born 1968), American Quarter Horse Jockey
Granville Carter, (1920–1992) American sculptor. Nicknamed "Dany Carter"
Graydon Carter (born 1949), Canadian-born American journalist
Greg Carter (disambiguation), multiple people
G. S. Carter (1910–1988), New Zealand surveyor and road engineer

H 
H. Adams Carter (1914–1995), American linguist, mountaineer and editor of the American Alpine Journal
Hamish Carter (born 1971), New Zealand triathlete
Harold Carter (disambiguation), multiple people
Harry Carter (disambiguation), multiple people
Hazel Carter (writer) (1894–1918), American who stowed away on a ship to France during WWI to be with her husband
H. E. Carter (1910–2007), American biochemist
Helen Carter (1927–1998), American country singer
Helena Carter (1923–2000), American actress
Helena Bonham Carter (born 1966), British actress
Henry Carter (disambiguation), multiple people
Herbert Carter (disambiguation), multiple people
Hodding Carter (1907–1972), American journalist and author
Hodding Carter III (born 1935), American journalist and politician
Howard Carter (disambiguation), multiple people
Howie Carter (1904–1991), American baseball player John Howard Carter
Hugh Carter (1920–1999), American politician
Hykeem Carter (born 2000), American rapper known as "Baby Keem"

I 
Ian Carter (born 1967), British-born Canadian soccer player

J 
Jack Carter (disambiguation), multiple people
Jalen Carter (born 2001), American football player
Jamal Carter (born 1994), American football player
James Carter (disambiguation), multiple people
Janette Carter (1923–2006), American musician
Janis Carter (1913–1994), American actress
Jared Carter (Latter Day Saints) (1801–1849), American religious leader
Jared Carter (poet) (born 1939), American poet
Jason Carter (disambiguation), multiple people
Ja'Tyre Carter (born 1999), American football player
Jeff Carter (disambiguation), multiple people
Jenny Carter (born 1931), Canadian politician, former cabinet minister
Jermaine Carter (born 1995), American football player
Jerome Carter (born 1982), American football safety
Jerome Carter (athlete) (born 1963), American high jumper, former co-American record holder, 1988
Jess Carter (born 1997), British footballer
Jesse F. Carter (1873–1943), American associate justice of the South Carolina Supreme Court
Jesse W. Carter (1888–1959), American associate justice of the California Supreme Court
Jevon Carter (born 1995), American basketball player
Jill Carter-Hansen (née Carter, born 1941), New Zealand-born illustrator, author and filmmaker
Jill P. Carter (born 1964), American politician in Maryland
Jim Carter – see James Carter (disambiguation), multiple people
Jimmy Carter (born 1924), former U.S. president
Joan Carter (born 1943), American businesswoman and philanthropist
Joanne Carter (born 1980), Australian figure skating Olympian
Joe Carter - see Joseph Carter (disambiguation), multiple people
Jordan Carter (born 1996), American rapper known as "Playboi Carti"
John Carter (disambiguation), multiple people, includes people named Johnny Carter
Jon Carter (American football) (born 1965), American football defensive lineman
Jon Carter (born 1970), English DJ and businessman
Jonathan Carter (disambiguation), multiple people
Joseph Carter (disambiguation), multiple people
Josiah Carter (1813–1868), American politician
J. P. Carter (1915–2000), American military officer and politician
June Carter (1929–2003), American country singer, wife of Johnny Cash
Justin Carter (born 1987), American basketball player

K 
Kayli Carter, American actress
Keith Carter (disambiguation), multiple people
Kenneth Carter (disambiguation), multiple people, also includes people named Ken or Kenny Carter
Kent Carter (born 1939), American jazz bassist
Kent Carter (gridiron football) (born 1950), American football player
Kerry Carter (born 1980), Trinidadian-born gridiron football fullback
Kevin Carter (1961–1994), South African photojournalist
Kevin Carter (American football) (born 1973), American National Football League player
Kid Carter (fl. 1903–06), American baseball player
Kim Carter, Canadian public servant
Kyle Carter (born 1992), American football tight end
Kym Carter (born 1964), American heptathlete

L 
Lance Carter (born 1974), American baseball player
Lance Carter (musician) (1955–2006), American jazz drummer
Landon Carter (1710–1778), Virginia planter
Larry Carter (born 1965), American baseball player
Laura Carter (actress) (born 1985), English actress and model
Laura Carter (musician), American multi-instrumentalist musician
Lee Carter (comics), 21st century British concept and comics artist
Lee Carter (born 1971), better known as Viper, American rapper
Les Carter (born 1958), better known as Fruitbat, English musician
Les Carter (footballer) (born 1960), English footballer
Leslie Carter (1986–2012), American pop singer
Mrs. Leslie Carter (1862–1937), American actress
Lillian Gordy Carter (1898–1983), known as "Miss Lillian", mother of former U.S. president Jimmy Carter
Lin Carter (1930–1988), American science fiction/fantasy author and editor
Linda Carter (disambiguation), multiple people
Lorenzo Carter (1767–1814), early American community leader
Lorenzo Carter (American football) (born 1995), American football player
Louis Carter (1953–2020), American football running back
Lyle Carter (born 1945), Canadian ice hockey and softball player
Lynda Carter (born 1951), American television actress and singer of cabarets
Lynne Carter (c. 1924 – 1985), American entertainer, actor and female impersonator

M 
Mandy Carter (activist) (born 1948), American LGBT activist
Mark Carter (footballer) (born 1960), English footballer
Mark Carter (rugby) (born 1968), New Zealand rugby union and rugby league footballer
Martin Carter (1927–1997), Guyanese poet
Marty Carter (born 1969), American football safety
Mary Kennedy Carter (1934–2010), American social studies teacher and civil rights activist
Matt Carter (disambiguation), multiple people
Maurice Carter (film designer) (1913–2000), British film production designer
Maurice Carter (racing driver), Canadian racer
Maurice Carter (basketball) (born 1976), American former professional basketball player
Maybelle Carter (1909–1978), American country music musician
Mel Carter (born 1939), American singer and actor
Melvin Carter (disambiguation), multiple people
Merri Sue Carter (born 1964), American astronomer
Michael Carter (disambiguation), multiple people
Michelle Carter (athlete) (born 1985), American shot putter
Murray Carter, (born 1931) Australian racing driver

N 
Nathan Carter (born 1990), Irish country singer
Neal Carter (1902–1978), Canadian mountaineer
Neil Carter (disambiguation), multiple people
Nell Carter (1948–2003), American singer and actress
Nelson Victor Carter (1887–1916), English recipient of the Victoria Cross
Nick Carter (disambiguation), multiple people, includes people named Nicholas Carter
Nigel Carter (born 1947), English environmentalist and politician
Nina Carter (born 1952), British model
Norah Carter (1881–1966), New Zealand photographer

O 
Oliver Jesse Carter (1911–1976), American federal judge
Orrin N. Carter (1854–1928), American state judge

P 
Pamela Carter (born 1949), American lawyer; Indiana Attorney General (1993–97)
Pat Carter (born 1966), American football tight end
Patrick Carter (disambiguation), multiple people
Paul Carter (disambiguation), multiple people
Paula Carter (1940–2001), American politician from Missouri 
Perry Carter (born 1971), American football defensive back
Peter Carter (disambiguation), multiple people
Philip Carter (1927–2015), Scottish-born football director
Phillip Carter (disambiguation), multiple people
Pip Carter, English actor

Q 
Quincy Carter (born 1977), American professional football player

R 
Raich Carter (1913–1994), English footballer and cricketer
Ralph Carter (born 1961), American actor
Raymond Carter (disambiguation), multiple people
Reggie Carter (1957–1999), American baseball player
Regina Carter (born 1966), American jazz violinist
Reginald Carter (disambiguation), multiple people
Rich Carter (born 1971), American chemistry professor
Richard Carter (disambiguation), multiple people
Rick Carter (born 1952), American production designer and art director
Rob Carter (born 1949), American professor of typographer and graphic design
Robert Carter (disambiguation), multiple people, includes people named Bob Carter
Rod Carter (born 1954), Australian rules football from Victoria
Rodney Carter (born 1964), American football running back
Roger Carter (disambiguation), multiple people
Ron Carter (disambiguation), multiple people
Ronan Carter (born 1996), English actor
Ron'Dell Carter (born 1997), American football player
Rosalynn Carter (born 1927), former First Lady of the United States, wife of Jimmy Carter
Ross Carter (1914–2002), American footballer
Roy Carter (born 1948), English oboist
Roy Carter (footballer), English footballer
Rubin Carter (1937–2014), American-Canadian boxer wrongfully convicted of murder
Rubin Carter (American football) (born 1952), American football defensive tackle
Russell Carter (American football) (born 1962), American footballer
Russell Carter (basketball) (born 1985), American basketball player
Russell Gordon Carter (1892–1957), American author
Ruth E. Carter, American costume designer
Ryan Carter (born 1983), American ice hockey player

S 
Sam Carter (disambiguation), multiple people
Sammy Carter (1878–1948), English-born Australian cricketer
Samuel Carter (disambiguation), multiple people
Sara Carter (1898–1979), American country music musician
Sarah Carter (born 1980), Canadian actress
Scott Carter (Australia rugby league), Australian rugby league footballer who played in the 1980s and 1990s
Scott Carter (sports administrator), New Zealand sports administrator
 Shawn Carter (born 1969), American rapper better known as Jay-Z
Shayne Carter (born 1964), New Zealand rock singer
Shonie Carter (born 1972), American mixed martial artist
Shy Carter (born 1984), American songwriter, record producer and singer
Sol Carter (1908–2006), American baseball pitcher
Sonny Carter (1947–1991), American physician, astronaut, naval officer and professional soccer player
Stacy Carter (born 1970), known as Miss Kitty or The Kat, American professional wrestler
Stephen Carter (disambiguation), multiple people
Steve Carter (disambiguation), multiple people, includes people named Steven Carter
Sue Carter (born 1956), Australian politician
Sydney Carter (1915–2004), English poet and songwriter: "Lord of the Dance"

T 
Terry Carter (born 1928), American actor and filmmaker
Thomas Carter (disambiguation), multiple people
Tim Carter (disambiguation), multiple people
Timothy Carter (disambiguation), multiple people
T. J. Carter (disambiguation), multiple people
Toby Carter (1910–1988), New Zealand surveyor and road engineer
Todd Carter (born 1986), American football placekicker
Tom Carter (disambiguation), multiple people
Tony Carter (disambiguation), multiple people
Tory Carter (born 1999), American football player
Troy Carter (disambiguation), multiple people
Tyler Carter (born 1991), American singer-songwriter
Tyler Carter (alpine skier) (born 1994), American para-alpine skier
Tyron Carter (born 1985), French singer and rapper
Tyrone Carter (born 1976), American football defensive back
Tyrone Carter (politician), American politician in Michigan

V 
Valerie Carter (1952–2017), American singer-songwriter
Vednita Carter, 21st century American anti-prostitution activist and author
Vince Carter (born 1977), American professional basketball player
Vincent Carter (1891–1972), American congressman from Wyoming
Virgil Carter (born 1945), American football quarterback
Virginia Carter (born 1936), Canadian physicist and entertainment executive
Vivian Carter (1921–1989), American record company executive and radio dj
Vivien Carter, Australian actress, singer and dancer

W 
Wally Carter (1909–2001), Australian rules football player and coach from Victoria
Wally Carter (footballer, born 1898) (1898–1970), Australian rules footballer from Victoria
Walter C. Carter (1929–2002), Canadian Member of Parliament
Walter E. Carter Jr., American vice admiral
Walter P. Carter (1923–1971), American civil rights activist in Baltimore
Wendell Carter Jr., American basketball player for the Orlando Magic
Wil Carter (born 1988), American basketball player
Wilf Carter (footballer) (1933–2013), English footballer
Wilf Carter (musician) (1904–1996), Canadian musician
Wilfred Carter (1896–1975), English cricketer and footballer
William Carter (disambiguation), multiple people
Willoughby Harcourt Carter (1822–1900), first appointed Chief Constable of Buckinghamshire
Wilson Carter, Scottish footballer in the 1960s
Winifred Carter (c. 1883–1949), English author and playwright

X 
Xavier Carter (born December 1985), American athlete

Y 
Yannick Carter (born 1984), Canadian football linebacker
Yvonne Carter (1959–2009), British doctor and Dean of Warwick Medical School

Z
Zachary Carter (born 1999), American football player

People with the given name 

Carter Beauford (born 1957), American drummer and founding member of the Dave Matthews Band
Carter Blackburn (born 1979), American sportscaster
Carter Braxton (1736–1797), American signer of the Declaration of Independence, representative of Virginia
Carter Moore Braxton (1836-1896), American civil engineer, businessman, and soldier
Carter Burwell (born 1955), American composer of film soundtracks
Carter Camp (1941–2013), American Indian Movement activist who played a leading role in the 1972 Trail of Broken Treaties.
Carter Camper (born 1988), American ice hockey player
Carter Coughlin (born 1997), American football player
Carter Glass (1858–1946), American politician from Virginia
Carter Harrison Sr. (1825–1893), assassinated mayor of Chicago
Carter Harrison Jr. (1860–1953), mayor of Chicago
Carter Bassett Harrison (c. 1756 – 1808), American politician from Virginia, brother of U.S. president William Henry Harrison
Carter Hart (born 1998), Canadian ice hockey goaltender
Carter Jenkins (born 1991), American actor, starred in Surface
Carter Revard (1931–2022), American writer and poet
Carter Rubin (born 2005), American singer
Carter B. Magruder (1900–1988), United States Army general
Carter O'Donnell (born 1998), American football player
Carter Page (born 1971), American petroleum industry consultant and a former foreign-policy adviser to Donald Trump
Carter Stanley (1925–1966), American bluegrass musician; one of The Stanley Brothers
Carter Vaughan (born 2000), Canadian Calgary Co-operative cashier
Carter Verhaeghe (born 1995), Canadian ice hockey player
Carter G. Woodson (1875–1950), American historian, author, journalist, founder of Black History Month

People with the middle name
Paul Carter Harrison (1936–2022), American playwright and educator

Fictional characters

Given name
Carter (Teenage Mutant Ninja Turtles), a character from the Teenage Mutant Ninja Turtles
 Carter-A259, a Spartan in Halo: Reach
 Lt. Carter Blake, in the video game Heavy Rain
Carter Grayson, in the Power Rangers: Lightspeed Rescue TV series
 Carter Hall, the Golden Age DC Comics super-hero Hawkman
 Carter Hayes, in the 1990 film Pacific Heights
 Carter Horton, in three films in the Final Destination series
Carter Kane, in The Kane Chronicles trilogy
 Carter Mason, character in the 2009 Disney Channel Movie Princess Protection Program, played by Selena Gomez
Carter Pewterschmidt, father of Lois Griffin in the animated TV series Family Guy
 Carter Slade, the real name of the masked western hero the Phantom Rider (originally known as Ghost Rider)
 Carter Stevens, main character in the television series Finding Carter
 Carter Davis, a character in Happy Death Day and Happy Death Day 2U, played by Israel Broussard
 Carter Lee, the main protagonist of South Korean Netflix film Carter (2022 film), portrayed by Joo Won

Surname
Adam Carter, in the Spooks TV series
Alan Carter, in the Space: 1999 TV series
 Chick Carter, title character of Chick Carter, Boy Detective, a radio program (1943–1945), and Chick Carter, Detective, a 1946 Columbia film serial
Daisy Carter, in the American soap opera The Young and the Restless
Damon Carter, in the American drama series Soul Food
Daniel Carter, one of three characters with the identity of Supernova in the DC Comics Universe
David Carter (character), protagonist of the animated miniseries Invasion America
Doug Carter, in the British soap opera Hollyoaks
Edison Carter, in the science fiction TV series Max Headroom
 Frank Carter, police officer in the video game The Getaway
 Harley Carter, protagonist of the Canadian TV series Carter
General Alan Carter, a character in the 1966 film Fantastic Voyage
Heston Carter, in the British soap opera Doctors
 Jack Carter, protagonist of the Ted Lewis novel Jack's Return Home (later retitled Get Carter) and its sequels and film adaptations
Jack Carter (Eureka), sheriff in the 2006 TV series Eureka
Jacob Carter, in the science fiction TV series Stargate SG-1
 James Carter, detective in the Rush Hour (franchise) films
John Carter, medical doctor in the American TV series ER
John Carter of Mars, in the Barsoom series of Edgar Rice Burroughs
Johnny Carter (EastEnders), in the British soap opera EastEnders
Linda Carter, in EastEnders
 Logan Carter, in the video game series Dead Island
 Lucy Carter, protagonist of the TV sitcom Here's Lucy, played by Lucille Ball
Mandy Carter, in Ackley Bridge
 Mandy Carter, in Mandy
 Michael Jon Carter, the DC Comics super hero known as Booster Gold
Mick Carter, in EastEnders
Nancy Carter, in EastEnders
Nick Carter (literary character), fictional detective who first appeared in American dime novels in the 1890s
Peggy Carter, a Marvel Comics character
Peggy Carter (Marvel Cinematic Universe), the Marvel Cinematic Universe counterpart
Randolph Carter, main character of many of H.P. Lovecraft's Dream-Cycle works
Samantha Carter, in the science-fiction TV series Stargate SG-1, daughter of Jacob Carter
Sharon Carter, Marvel Comics character
Sharon Carter (Marvel Cinematic Universe), the Marvel Cinematic Universe counterpart
Sheila Carter, in the American soap operas The Young and the Restless and The Bold and the Beautiful
Shirley Carter, in EastEnders
Stan Carter, in EastEnders
Tina Carter, in EastEnders
 Zebadiah John Carter, a protagonist of the Robert Heinlein novel The Number of the Beast
Zoe Carter, in the 2006 TV series Eureka
Zsa Zsa Carter, in EastEnders

See also
Justice Carter (disambiguation)
Cartter, given name and surname
McCarter, surname

References

External links
 Carter households in mid-19th century Ireland

English-language surnames
Surnames of Irish origin
Occupational surnames
English-language occupational surnames